Occurrence may refer to:

Occurrence (type–token distinction), concept in type–token distinction
Occurrence (liturgical),  Catholic liturgical term that covers the process when two liturgical offices coincide on the same day